Recurvidris is a genus of ants in the subfamily Myrmicinae. The genus is distributed in the Indomalayan realm, where the ants are found on the forest floor.

Species
Recurvidris browni Bolton, 1992
Recurvidris glabriceps Zhou, 2000
Recurvidris hebe Bolton, 1992
Recurvidris kemneri (Wheeler & Wheeler, 1954)
Recurvidris lekakuli Jaitrong, Tokeeree & Pitaktunsakul, 2019
Recurvidris nigrans Zettel, 2008
Recurvidris nuwa Xu & Zheng, 1995
Recurvidris pickburni Bolton, 1992
Recurvidris proles Bolton, 1992
Recurvidris recurvispinosa (Forel, 1890)
Recurvidris williami Bolton, 1992

References

External links

Myrmicinae
Ant genera